Argument About Basia is a Polish novel by Kornel Makuszyński, written in 1936, but released one year later.

Plot
The book tells the story of a little orphan girl, Basia, sent by train alone after her mother's death. When a piece of paper with an address of Basia's family is destroyed, Basia is taken by an actor who managed to read the address and takes the girl there. But he turns out to be wrong ...

Screenings
It was filmed twice - in 1959 and 1995 (this time, also with a mini-series released in 1997).

1959 version
Black-and-white movie directed by Maria Kaniewska and starred : 
 Małgorzata Piekarska as Basia
 Jerzy Duszyński as Mr Olszowski 
 Ewa Krasnodębska as Miss Olszańska 
 Roman Niewiarowicz as Walicki 
 Mieczysław Gajda as Szot 
and others

1995 and 1997 versions
Starring : 
 Agata Marciniak as little Basia 
 Paulina Tworzyańska as teenage Basia 
 Piotr Fronczewski as Mr Olszowski
 Maria Gładkowska as Miss Olszańska
 Andrzej Szczepkowski as Walicki
 Jan Jankowski as Szot
and others

External links
 
 
 

Polish novels
Polish drama films
1959 films
1995 films
Polish-language films
20th-century Polish novels